Darryl Longdon (born 8 November 2000) is a footballer who plays as a forward. Born in the United States, he represents Dominica national football team internationally.

Youth
Longdon attended East Stroudsburg High School South in East Stroudsburg, Pennsylvania. In 2017, he was named the All-Eastern Pennsylvania Conference Most Valuable Player in boys' soccer.

Club career

FC Tucson
Longdon made his league debut for the club on 25 July 2020, coming on as a 70th-minute substitute for Josh Coan in a 2-1 away victory over Fort Lauderdale CF.

International career
He made his debut for Dominica national football team on 24 March 2021 in a World Cup qualifier against the Dominican Republic.

International goals
Scores and results list Dominica's goal tally first, score column indicates score after each Longdon goal.

International career statistics

References

External links
Darryl Longdon at FC Tucson

2000 births
Living people
Soccer players from New York (state)
Dominica footballers
Dominica international footballers
American people of Dominica descent
American soccer players
FC Tucson players
USL League One players
Association football forwards
American expatriate soccer players